John Feir is a Filipino comedian and actor. He is known for his work on Encantadia, Alyas Robin Hood and Pepito Manaloto. He is currently working as an exclusive talent of GMA Network.

Career
John started his TV career as part of a production team in various shows such as Lunch Date, SST, and Nut's Entertainment. In 1996, he got his break in the variety show That's Entertainment as Belli Flori.

Filmography

Television

Movies

References

External links 
 

Filipino male comedians
Filipino male film actors
Filipino male television actors
Living people
GMA Network personalities
Tagalog people
Year of birth missing (living people)